Fangzheng County is a county of Heilongjiang Province, Northeast China, it is under the administration of the prefecture-level city of Harbin, the capital of Heilongjiang. It borders Tonghe County to the north, Yilan County to the northeast, Yanshou County to the south, Bin County to the west, and Mulan County to the northwest, as well as the prefecture-level city of Mudanjiang to the northwest.

Administrative divisions 
Fangzheng County is divided into 4 towns and 4 townships. 
4 towns
 Fangzheng, Huifa, Daluomi, Demoli
4 townships
 Tianmen, Songnan, Deshan, Baoxing

Demographics

There are many descendants of Japanese settlers in Manchukuo.

Climate

Notes and references

External links 
  Government site

Fangzheng
Japanese diaspora in China